Pleasant Site is an unincorporated community in Franklin County, Alabama, United States.

History
The name Pleasant Site comes from a subjectively descriptive term of the surrounding area.
A post office operated under the name Pleasant Site from 1843 to 1911.

During the Civil War, Company B of the 27th Alabama Infantry (known as the "Confederate Sentinels") was organized at Pleasant Site. The last surviving Confederate veteran in Franklin County, Allen Haley Taylor, is buried in Pleasant Site.

References

Unincorporated communities in Franklin County, Alabama
Unincorporated communities in Alabama